Somewhere in England is a 1940 British comedy film directed by John E. Blakeley and starring Frank Randle, Harry Korris and Winki Turner. It follows the adventures of an anti-authoritarian private stationed in a military camp in the North of England during the Second World War. It was the first in the Somewhere film series, followed by its sequel Somewhere in Camp in 1942.

Plot
In a North of England training camp, lovestruck Corporal Kenyon (Harry Kemble) is framed and demoted in rank by a rival in love for the affections of the Adjutant's daughter. Four friends rally round to help clear the Corporal's name.

Cast
 Frank Randle - Pte. Randle
 Harry Korris - Sgt. Korris
 Winki Turner - Irene Morant
 Dan Young - Pte. Young
 Robbie Vincent - Pte. Enoch
 Harry Kemble - Cpl. Jack Kenyon
 John Singer - Bert Smith
 Sydney Moncton - Adjutant
 Stanley King
 The 8 Master Singers
 Percival Mackey & His Orchestra - Themselves

References

Bibliography
 Rattigan, Neil. This is England: British film and the People's War, 1939-1945. Associated University Presses, 2001.

External links

1940 films
1940 comedy films
Films directed by John E. Blakeley
British comedy films
Military humor in film
British black-and-white films
Films scored by Percival Mackey
Films shot in Greater Manchester
1940s English-language films
1940s British films